Imogen Ayris (born 12 December 2000) is a New Zealand athlete who competes in the pole vault. She won the bronze medal in the pole vault representing her country at the 2022 Commonwealth Games.

Biography
Ayris was born in Auckland on 12 December 2000, the daughter of Barny and Bridget Ayris. She was educated at Takapuna Grammar School, and is now studying exercise science at the University of Auckland.

Ayris began competing in athletics as a six-year-old at the Takapuna Athletic and Harrier Club, but also was a promising gymnast, representing New Zealand in an international event against Australia. She took up the pole vault when she was 13 years old, coached by Jeremy McColl. She finished third in the pole vault at the national secondary schools championships six months later, and won the national junior title at the 2015 national athletic championships. In 2016, aged 15, she became the youngest female New Zealand athlete to clear four metres. In 2018, Ayris won both the national under-20 and senior national pole vault titles, and she subsequently won the national title again in 2020 and 2021.

Ayris represented New Zealand in the pole vault at the 2018 IAAF World Under-20 Championships, finishing 19th, with a best height of 3.95 m. The following year, she competed at the Athletics at the 2019 Summer Universiade, where she placed equal tenth in the pole vault, recording a height of 4.11 m. At the 2022 Commonwealth Games, Ayris cleared 4.45 m to win the bronze medal in the pole vault, despite competing with a fractured bone in her foot.

References

External links
 
 
 

2000 births
Living people
New Zealand female pole vaulters
Commonwealth Games medallists in athletics
Commonwealth Games bronze medallists for New Zealand
Athletes (track and field) at the 2022 Commonwealth Games
People educated at Takapuna Grammar School
University of Auckland alumni
Athletes from Auckland
21st-century New Zealand women
Medallists at the 2022 Commonwealth Games